Marko Gavrilović is a politician in Serbia. He served in the National Assembly of Serbia from 2016 to 2017 as a member of the Serbian Progressive Party.

Private career
Gavrilović is an economist based in the Belgrade municipality of Obrenovac.

Parliamentarian
Gavrilović received the 112th position on the Progressive Party's Aleksandar Vučić – Serbia Is Winning list in the 2016 Serbian parliamentary election and was elected when the list won a landslide victory with 131 out of 250 mandates. During his time in the assembly, he was a member of the committee on agriculture, forestry, and water management; a deputy member of two other committees; and a member of the parliamentary friendship groups for Australia, Austria, Belarus, Brazil, Finland, Germany, Japan, Kazakhstan, Russia, and Syria. He resigned from the assembly on October 11, 2017.

References

1978 births
Living people
Members of the National Assembly (Serbia)
Politicians from Belgrade
Serbian Progressive Party politicians